National Assembly Football Club is a Zambian football club based in Lusaka. They play in the top division in Zambian football. Their home stadium is Edwin Imboela Stadium.

References

Football clubs in Zambia
Sport in Lusaka